Brothomstates is one of the stage names of Lassi Nikko, a Finnish composer and musician. He also used to produce music in the demoscene under the moniker of Dune in the demogroup Orange. His works are mostly downtempo or ambient, but he is also known for his complex and abstract melodies and unique sounding drum programming. His 1998 debut album kobn-tich-ey was amongst the first mp3-only LPs released.

In the media
The track "Adozenaday" from the Qtio single featured on a TV advertising campaign in the UK by the soft drinks manufacturer Sprite.

Discography

Albums
 kobn-tich-ey (self-published MP3 release, 1998, rereleased and remastered in 2020)
 Claro (Warp, 2001)

EPs
 Untitled (Misc, 2017)
 Qtio (Warp, 2001)
 Brothom States EP (Exogenic, 2000)

Singles
 Rktic (Arcola, 2004)
 Brothomstrain vs Blamstates (Narita, 2006)

See also
 Merck Records
 Demoscene

References

External links

 Brothomstates at Warp Records

Finnish male musicians
Tracker musicians
Demosceners
Living people
Intelligent dance musicians
Year of birth missing (living people)